Violet Benson, better known by her online alias and persona Daddy Issues, is a Russian-born American comedian best known for running the Instagram account "Daddy Issues".

Early Life

Benson was born in Saint Petersburg, Russia, and lived briefly in Israel before her family won the green card lottery and they moved to Los Angeles, California when she was 14. Benson has two degrees, in Business Law and Accounting. Benson was an accountant at a large public accounting firm when she says she the Daddy Issues account as "a funny escape".

Career
Benson started her Daddy Issues Instagram account on July 5, 2014. Benson has earned over 5 million followers on Instagram and is known as one of the fastest growing accounts and one of the largest funny female accounts that even MTV took notice. Though best known for Instagram, Benson is also a stand up comedian, television host, and a podcast host.

Benson hosts the popular podcasts, Almost Adulting, with Gumball  and, Hey Besties, exclusively with Spotify and Spotify Live. 

Benson kept her identity a secret at first until August 31, 2015 due to a lack of self confidence, when she finally decided to reveal her identity via an exclusive interview with MTV. Before her big reveal, Benson served as a guest blogger for MTV during the pre-show coverage for the 2015 Video Music Awards and was later named "The Instagram Meme Queen" by Vanity Fair

Style of comedy
Benson blogs, curates and creates original memes, and creates funny videos where she makes fun of herself and the struggles of growing up in the 21st century. Benson also does stand up comedy.

References

Living people
American Internet celebrities
American women comedians
21st-century American actresses
Russian emigrants to the United States
Entertainers from Los Angeles
Comedians from California
21st-century American comedians
Year of birth missing (living people)